Sofia Karlsson (born 1978) is a Swedish modern dancer. She holds bachelor's degree of Dance Pedagogy from Danshögskolan and master's degree of Dance from Finnish Theatre Academy.

She has most recently worked with choreographers Kenneth Kvarnström and Hiroaki Umeda.

Appearances 
 Destruction Song 2008
 Work in Progress 2008
 Rush Man Waiting Mind 2008
 Daydream Junkies 2007
 Pikkurikolliset 2007
 Absoluutti 2007
 Gorgeous Gavin 2007
 Granny Smith 2006
 Viivana 2006
 Second Hand Shop - toisen käden kauppa 2006
 Hämärän hohde 2005
 Raw Dog 2005
 The Fallen Ones 2004
 POINT 2003

References 

 Dance Info Finland - Sofia Karlsson

Notes 

Swedish female dancers
1978 births
Living people
Modern dancers